The Bulla Creek, a mostlyperennial river that is part of the Lachlan sub-catchment of the Murrumbidgee catchment within the Murray–Darling basin, is located in the South West Slopes region of New South Wales, Australia. The Bulla Creek is only connected to the Murray Darling basin when the Bland Creek and both the Lachlan and Murrumbidgee Rivers are in flood.

Course and features 
The Burrangong Creek is a tributary of the Bland Creek. The Bulla Creek descends  over its  course.

See also 

 List of rivers of New South Wales (A-K)
 Rivers of New South Wales

References

External links
 

Tributaries of the Lachlan River
Rivers of New South Wales
Hilltops Council